Sir Robert Hughes Williams,  (born 22 December 1941), commonly known as Robin Williams, is a Welsh physicist and academic, specialising in solid state physics and semiconductors. He was Vice-Chancellor of University of Wales, Swansea from  1994 to 2003. He had taught at the New University of Ulster and University of Wales, College of Cardiff, before joining Swansea.

Honours
In 1990, Williams was elected a Fellow of the Royal Society (FRS), the United Kingdom's national academy for the sciences. In 2010, he was elected a Founding Fellow of the Learned Society of Wales (FLSW).

He was appointed Commander of the Order of the British Empire (CBE) in the 2004 New Year Honours for services to education and to the community in Swansea and knighted in the 2019 Birthday Honours for services to higher education, research and the Welsh language.

Selected works

References

1941 births
Welsh physicists
Academics of Ulster University
Academics of Cardiff University
Academics of Swansea University
Knights Bachelor
Commanders of the Order of the British Empire
Fellows of the Royal Society
Fellows of the Learned Society of Wales
Living people